Food spoilage is the process where a food product becomes unsuitable to ingest by the consumer. The cause of such a process is due to many outside factors as a side-effect of the type of product it is, as well as how the product is packaged and stored. Due to food spoilage, one-third of the world's food produced for the consumption of humans is lost every year. Bacteria and various fungi are the cause of spoilage and can create serious consequences for the consumers, but there are preventive measures that can be taken.

Bacteria 
Bacteria are responsible for some of the spoilage of food. When bacteria breaks down the food, acids and other waste products are generated in the process. While the bacteria itself may or may not be harmful, the waste products may be unpleasant to taste or may even be harmful to one's health.
There are two types of pathogenic bacteria that target different categories of food. The first type is called Clostridium botulinum and targets food such as meat and poultry, and Bacillus cereus, which targets milk and cream. When stored or subjected to unruly conditions, the organisms will begin to breed apace, releasing harmful toxins that can cause severe illness, even when cooked safely.

Fungi 

Fungi have been seen as a method of food spoilage, causing only an undesirable appearance to food, however, there has been significant evidence of various fungi being a cause of death of many people spanning across hundreds of years in many places through the world. Fungi are caused by acidifying, fermenting, discoloring and disintegrating processes and can create fuzz, powder and slimes of many different colors, including black, white, red, brown and green.

Mold is a type of fungus, but the two terms are not reciprocal of each other; they have their own defining features and perform their own tasks. Very well known types of mold are Aspergillus and Penicillium, and, like regular fungi, create a fuzz, powder and slime of various colors.

Yeast is also a type of fungus that grows vegetatively via single cells that either bud or divide by way of fission, allowing for yeast to multiply in liquid environments favoring the dissemination of single celled microorganisms. Yeast forms mainly in liquid environments and anaerobic conditions, but being single celled, it oftentimes cannot spread on or into solid surfaces where other fungus flourish. Yeast also produces at a slower rate than bacteria, therefore being at a disadvantage in environments where bacteria are. Yeasts can be responsible for the decomposition of food with a high sugar content. The same effect is useful in the production of various types of food and beverages, such as bread, yogurt, cider, and alcoholic beverages.

Signs 

Signs of food spoilage may include an appearance different from the food in its fresh form, such as a change in color, a change in texture, an unpleasant odour, or an undesirable taste. The item may become softer than normal. If mold occurs, it is often visible externally on the item.

Consequences 
Spoilage bacteria do not normally cause "food poisoning"; typically, the microorganisms that cause foodborne illnesses are odorless and flavourless, and otherwise undetectable outside the lab.
Eating deteriorated food could not be considered safe due to mycotoxins or microbial wastes. Some pathogenic bacteria, such as Clostridium perfringens and Bacillus cereus, are capable of causing spoilage.

Issues of food spoilage do not necessarily have to do with the quality of the food, but more so with the safety of consuming said food. However, there are cases where food has been proven to contain toxic ingredients. 200 years ago, Claviceps purpurea, a type of fungus, was linked to human diseases and 100 years ago in Japan, yellow rice was found to contain toxic ingredients.

Prevention 
A number of methods of prevention can be used that can either totally prevent, delay, or otherwise reduce food spoilage. A food rotation system uses the first in first out method (FIFO), which ensures that the first item purchased is the first item consumed.

Preservatives can expand the shelf life of food and can lengthen the time long enough for it to be harvested, processed, sold, and kept in the consumer's home for a reasonable length of time. One of the age old techniques for food preservation, to avoid mold and fungus growth, is the process of drying out the food or dehydrating it. While there is a chance of it developing a fungus targeted towards dried food products, the chances are quite low.

Other than drying, other methods include salting, curing, canning, refrigeration, freezing, preservatives, irradiation, and high hydrostatic pressure: Refrigeration can increase the shelf life of certain foods and beverages, though with most items, it does not indefinitely expand it. Freezing can preserve food even longer, though even freezing has limitations. Canning of food can preserve food for a particularly long period of time, whether done at home or commercially. Canned food is vacuum packed in order to keep oxygen, which is needed by bacteria in aerobic spoilage, out of the can. Canning does have limitations, and does not preserve the food indefinitely. Lactic acid fermentation also preserves food and prevents spoilage.

Food like meat, poultry, milk and cream should be kept out of the Danger Zone (between ). Anything between that range is considered dangerous and can cause pathogenic toxins to be emitted, resulting in severe illness in the consumer. Another way to keep food from spoiling is by following a four step system: Clean, Separate, Cook, Chill.

See also 

 Decomposition
 Food preservation
 Food grading
 Foodborne illness
 Shelf life

References 

Food safety
Food preservation
Food waste